The Ghana National Party is a political party in Ghana. It was founded in 2007 and launched in May 2008. It contested the December 2008 elections but did not win any parliamentary seats. Its current leader is Kobina Amo-Aidoo.

See also
 List of political parties in Ghana

References

2007 establishments in Ghana
Political parties established in 2007
Political parties in Ghana